Voltas Limited is an Indian multinational home appliances and consumer electronics company headquartered in Mumbai. It designs, develops, manufactures and sells products including air conditioners, air coolers, refrigerators, washing machines, dishwashers, microwaves, air purifiers, water dispensers. The company was incorporated on 6 September 1954 in Mumbai, as a collaboration between Tata Sons and Volkart Brothers. The chairman of the company is Noel Tata and the managing director and chief executive officer of the company is Pradeep Bakshi. Its shares are traded on the Bombay Stock Exchange and National Stock Exchange of India.

Name 
The company name is a portmanteau of Volkart brothers and Tata Sons.

Operations
The company is broadly structured into projects and products business. The projects business is divided into Domestic Projects Group (DPG) and International Operations Business Group (IOBG). Meanwhile, the products business is classified into Unitary Products Business Group (UPBG), Mining & Construction Equipment Division (MCED), and Textile Machinery Division (TMD).

The Unitary Products business group manufacture products in categories including air conditioners, air coolers, commercial refrigerators, water coolers, and water dispensers. Voltas is the largest air conditioning brand in India. It started manufacturing air conditioners in the 1960s under license from Carrier Corporation  Voltas produced India's first window air conditioner with DC-inverter-based variable-speed motors. DC Inverter Technology is an innovative technology that provides superior cooling while reducing the frequency of turning the compressor on and off. This helps in reducing the power consumption to a greater extent. Voltas also has a large network of repair centers. The firm is also a major producer of evaporative coolers, which are widely used for comfort cooling in arid and semi-arid climates.

Voltas has also entered into a joint venture with Turkey-based Ardutch (a subsidiary of Arçelik, part of the Koç Group making the Beko brand of home appliances). It began producing refrigerators, air conditioners, washing machines and kitchen appliances under the name of Voltas Beko.

Voltas has completed many international projects, including air conditioning in the world's tallest building, the Burj Khalifa, in the once largest ocean liner, Palace of Sultanate of Oman , Bahrain City Centre Mall , Ferrari World Theme Park in Abu Dhabi, Sidra Medical and Research Centre in Qatar, Villaggio Mall in Qatar and Dubai's Mall of Emirates.

References

 

Tata Group
Engineering companies of India
Manufacturing companies based in Mumbai
Manufacturing companies established in 1954
Heating, ventilation, and air conditioning companies
Indian brands
1954 establishments in Bombay State
Indian companies established in 1954
Companies listed on the National Stock Exchange of India
Companies listed on the Bombay Stock Exchange
Home appliance manufacturers of India